Nelson Bar is a former settlement in Butte County, California. It is now under Lake Oroville. The Nelson Bar bridge spanned the West Branch of the Feather River until Oroville Dam was built. It was submerged under Lake Oroville.

References

External links

Former settlements in Butte County, California
Former populated places in California
Destroyed towns
Submerged settlements in the United States